Bogston is an area of the towns of Port Glasgow and Greenock in the council area of Inverclyde, Scotland. It is 35 km (21¾ miles) west of Glasgow.

The area is served by Bogston railway station.

References

Populated places in Inverclyde